Jack William Fuller (October 21, 1946 – June 21, 2016) was an American journalist who spent nearly forty years working in newspapers and was the author of seven novels and two books on journalism.

Biography
Fuller was born in Chicago, Illinois. He was a 1964 alumnus of Homewood-Flossmoor High School in Flossmoor, Illinois, and a graduate of Northwestern's Medill School of Journalism and Yale Law School.

He began his journalism career as a copyboy for the Chicago Tribune. Later he became a police reporter, a war correspondent in Vietnam, and a Washington correspondent. He worked for City News Bureau of Chicago, The Chicago Daily News, Pacific Stars and Stripes, and The Washington Post, as well as the Tribune. Fuller won the Pulitzer Prize for Editorial Writing in 1986 for his Tribune editorials on constitutional issues.

During the administration of President Gerald Ford, Fuller served as Special Assistant to United States Attorney General Edward Levi.

From 1989 to 1997 he was editor and then publisher of the Chicago Tribune. From 1997 to 2005 he served as president of the Tribune Publishing Company.

He served on the board of the University of Chicago and the John D. and Catherine T. MacArthur Foundation.

Fuller died of cancer on June 21, 2016, at the age of 69.

Selected works 
 Convergence (Doubleday; University of Chicago Press, 1982) 
 Fragments (William Morrow; University of Chicago Press, 1984) 
 Mass (William Morrow, 1985) 
 Our Fathers' Shadows (William Morrow, 1987) 
 Legends' End (Hodder & Stoughton, 1990) 
 News Values: Ideas for an Information Age. Chicago: University of Chicago Press, 1996. 
 Best of Jackson Payne: A Novel (Alfred Knopf; University of Chicago Press, 2000) 
 Abbeville (Unbridled Books, 2008) 
 What Is Happening to News: The Information Explosion and the Crisis in Journalism. Chicago: University of Chicago Press, 2010.  — Read an excerpt.
 Levi, Edward H. Restoring Justice: The Speeches of Attorney General Edward H. Levi Edited by Jack Fuller. Chicago: University of Chicago Press, 2013.

References

External links
 Jack Fuller Papers at the Newberry Library
 
 

1946 births
2016 deaths
20th-century American novelists
21st-century American novelists
American male journalists
American male novelists
American publishers (people)
Pulitzer Prize for Editorial Writing winners
Writers from Chicago
Medill School of Journalism alumni
Yale Law School alumni
20th-century American male writers
21st-century American male writers
Novelists from Illinois
20th-century American non-fiction writers
21st-century American non-fiction writers
Homewood-Flossmoor High School alumni